The 2017 Big 12 Conference women's soccer tournament was the postseason women's soccer tournament for the Big 12 Conference held from November 1–5, 2017. The seven-match tournament took place at the Swope Soccer Village in Kansas City, Missouri. The eight-team single-elimination tournament consisted of three rounds based on seeding from regular season conference play. The West Virginia Mountaineers were the defending champions, but they were eliminated from the 2017 tournament by virtue of losing the penalty shoot-out tiebreaking procedure following a tie with the TCU Horned Frogs in the semifinals. The Baylor Bears won the title, defeating TCU 2–1 in overtime in the final. This was the second Big 12 tournament title for the Baylor women's soccer program and first for head coach Paul Jobson.

Regular season standings
Source:

Bracket

Schedule

Quarterfinals

Semifinals

Final

Statistics

Goalscorers 

 2 Goals
 Aline De Lima – Baylor
 Lauren Piercy – Baylor

1 Goal
 Michaela Abam – West Virginia
 Madeline Brem – Oklahoma
 Kennedy Brown – Baylor
 Allison Ganter – TCU
 Katie Glenn – Texas
 Mary Heiberger – Texas Tech
 Kayla Hill – TCU
 Julie James – Baylor
 Heather Kaleiohi  – West Virginia
 Ariel Leach – Baylor
 Alli Magaletta – West Virginia
 Katie McClure – Kansas
 Amandine Pierre-Louis – West Virginia
 Coumba Sow – Oklahoma State
 Ryan Williams – TCU
 Haley Woodward – Oklahoma State

Awards

Most valuable player
Source:
Offensive MVP – Aline de Lima – Baylor, Lima
Defensive MVP – Katie Lund – TCU

All-Tournament team

References

External links
2017 Big 12 Soccer Championships

 
Big 12 Conference Women's Soccer Tournament